In music, Op. 5 stands for Opus number 5. Compositions that are assigned this number include:

 Barber – The School for Scandal
 Beach – Mass in E-flat
 Beethoven – Cello Sonatas Nos. 1 and 2
 Berlioz – Requiem
 Brahms – Piano Sonata No. 3
 Chausson – Viviane
 Chopin – Rondo à la mazur
 Corelli – Twelve Violin Sonatas, Op. 5
 Dvořák – Piano Quintet No. 1
 G. English – Symphony No. 2
 Glazunov – Symphony No. 1
 Gottschalk – Le Bananier
 Liszt – Rondeau fantastique sur un thème espagnol
 Nielsen – String Quartet No. 2
 Rachmaninoff – Suite No. 1
 Reger – Cello Sonata No. 1
 Rimsky – Sadko
 Schoenberg – Pelleas und Melisande
 Schumann – Impromptus on a Theme by Clara Wieck
 Shostakovich – Three Fantastic Dances
 Strauss – Gesellschafts-Walzer
 Stravinsky – Funeral Song
 Tamberg – Concerto Grosso
 Vivaldi – Six Violin Sonatas, Op. 5